The Stein Brothers Building is a historic building in Hastings, Nebraska. It was built in 1906 for Charles Henry Dietrich, who served as the 11th Governor of Nebraska in 1901 and as a United States Senator from Nebraska from 1901 to 1905. Dietrich rented the building to Herman and Edmund Stein, two brothers who managed a dry goods and hardware store. The building was designed in the Prairie School architectural style. It has been listed on the National Register of Historic Places since May 1, 1979.

References

		
National Register of Historic Places in Adams County, Nebraska
Prairie School architecture in Nebraska
Buildings and structures completed in 1906
1906 establishments in Nebraska